This is a listing of the horses that finished in either first, second, or third place and the number of starters in the Dahlia Stakes (1985-2009), an American Thoroughbred Stakes race for fillies and mares three years-old and up at one mile (8 furlongs) run on turf at Laurel Park Racecourse in Laurel, Maryland.

References

 The Dahlia Stakes at Pedigree Query

Lists of horse racing results
Laurel Park Racecourse